First ladies and gentlemen of Pakistan is an unofficial title traditionally given, often interchangeably, to the wife or husband of the president and prime minister of Pakistan. The current First Ladies of Pakistan are Samina Alvi, wife of president Arif Alvi and Nusrat Shehbaz and Tehmina Durrani, wives of prime minister Shehbaz Sharif. Along with their spouse and children, the First Lady or Gentleman is a member of the First Family of Pakistan.

Consorts, first ladies and first gentlemen

List of consorts (monarchs of Pakistan – position abolished in 1956)

List of first ladies (governor-generals of Pakistan – position abolished in 1956)

List of first ladies and gentlemen of Pakistan (head of state – president of Pakistan)

Spouse of the prime minister of Pakistan

References

Spouses of prime ministers of Pakistan
Spouses of Pakistani politicians
Pakistan